Nongshim Co., Ltd. is a South Korean food and beverage company headquartered in Seoul, South Korea. Nongshim was founded in 1965 under the name Lotte Food Industrial Company. The name was changed to Nongshim in 1978.

The current logo was published in 1991, which took a form of a seed.  In 2003, the business switched to a holding company system and became a subsidiary of Nongshim Holdings.

Nongshim is the largest instant noodles and snack company in South Korea. At the end of 2015, Nongshim had 2.57 trillion won in assets and 2.81 trillion won in sales. It runs 11 factories worldwide, has subsidiaries in Korea and overseas, and operates in more than 100 countries. The company is currently chaired by Shin Dong-won, son of the founder Shin Choon-ho.

History

1965–1979 
On 18 September 1965, Nongshim was established under the name Lotte Food Industrial Company in Seoul, South Korea by Shin Choon-ho, brother of Lotte Corporation founder Shin Kyuk-ho. When Nongshim introduced its first ramyun, Lotte Ramyun, in 1965, there were 7 other companies in the market.

As a second mover in the ramyun industry, Nongshim focused on research and development. Along with South Korea's first commercialized snack, Shrimp Cracker (Hangul: 새우깡; Romanization: Saewookang; 1971), Beef Ramyun (Hangul: 소고기라면; 1970), and Nongshim Ramyun (1975), Nongshim achieved 35% market share in the mid-1970s. On 6 March 1978, Nongshim changed its name from Lotte Food Industrial Company to Nongshim Co., Ltd.

1980–1989 
During the 1980s, Nongshim invested highly on machinery, equipment, and systems. The Anseong factory was built in 1981 to specialize in powder soup, used to flavor the ramyun.

Many of Nongshim's famous ramyun products were introduced during the 1980s: Neoguri (Hangul: 너구리 라면; Seafood Udon Soup; 1982), Ansungtangmyun (Hangul: 안성탕면; 1983), Jjapagetti (Hangul: 짜파게티; 1984) And Shin Ramyun (Hangul: 신라면; 1986). Cup- and bowl-type noodles were also introduced during this period.

Nongshim's market share reached 40% in 1984, and became a leading company of the market in March 1985. With Shin Ramyun (1986), the most beloved instant noodle brand in South Korea, Nongshim reached 46.2% of the ramyun market share in 1987, 53.2% in 1988, and 58% in 1989.

1990–present 
On 1 January 1991, Nongshim introduced its new corporate identity (CI): Nongshim Seed. The Gumi factory was built in September 1991. Since 1994, Nongshim has used computer-integrated manufacturing for production.

The Asan factory was built in April 1993, and it specializes in potato and rice snacks. In April 1994, Nongshim introduced aseptic production system for cold noodles. In 2007, The Noksan factory was built to specialize in non-frying noodles and well-being (health) products.

During the 1990s, Nongshim focused on exporting and expanded their business in the global market. In July 1997, Nongshim began sponsoring the national Baduk Championship: Shin Ramyun Cup Baduk Championship.

Nongshim built factories in China in the late 1990s and early 2000s: Shanghai (1996), Qingdao (1998), Shenyang (2000), a second factory at Qingdao (2002), and Yanbian (2015). Originally there was difficulty entering the Chinese market until a male-themed advertising campaign for the very spicy Shin ramyun implied virility from eating such a peppery product.  In the U.S, Nongshim built a factory in Los Angeles in 2005.

Advertising 
Nongshim has been carrying out marketing and advertising that informs the characteristics of its products based on individual product brands rather than corporate brands. It also sets the criteria that Chairman Shin Chun-ho suggested: 'Advanced ads should not precede products.

Operation

Affiliates 
Nongshim has 10 affiliates: Nongshim Holdings, Taekyung Nongsan, Youlchon Chemistry, Mega Mart, Nongshim Communication, NDS (Nongshim Data System), Nongshim Engineering, Youlchol Foundation, Hotel Nongshim, and Nongshim Development.

Global operations 
Nongshim's headquarters is located in Seoul, South Korea. Nongshim products are now exported to over 100 countries around the world. As of 2016, Nongshim has 11 manufacturing plants around the world: Korea (Anyang, Ansung, Asan, Gumi, Busan, Noksan), United States (Rancho Cucamonga, CA), China (Shanghai, Qingdao, Shenyang, Yanbian). There are 7 sales distribution offices in 6 countries outside of South Korea: the United States, Canada, Australia, Japan, China and Vietnam.

Products 
Nongshim products include ramyun (instant noodles), snacks, and bottled water. There are more than 40 brands of ramyuns, produced by Nongshim, including South Korea's most popular ramyun brand, Shin Ramyun (1986). Nongshim has recently introduced new noodle brands in 2015: Jjawang (Hangul: 짜왕; Etymology: Portmanteau of Jjajangmyun (Black bean noodle) and Wang (Hangul: 왕; Hanja: 王; Translation: King); Translation: King of Jjajangmyun) and Matchampong (Hangul: 맛짬뽕; Etymology: Portmanteau of a Korean adjective mat (taste) and Champong (spicy seafood noodle soup); Translation: tasty champong noodle soup).

There are varieties of snack products including Shrimp Cracker (Hangul: 새우깡; Romanization: Saewookkang; 1971), the first commercialized snack in South Korea and Onion Rings (Hangul: 양파링; Romanization: Yangpa Ring; 1983), which is famous for its sliced-onion-ring shape.

Since 2012, Nongshim is producing its own bottled water called Baeksan Mountain Water, which is slowly filtered by Baekdu Mountain volcanic rock.

See also
 Nongshim RedForce
 Lotte Group

References

External links

 

Companies listed on the Korea Exchange
Food and drink companies established in 1965
Food and drink companies of South Korea
Food manufacturers of South Korea
Instant noodle brands
Manufacturing companies based in Seoul
South Korean brands
South Korean companies established in 1965
Shin family